Montagnieu is a commune in the Ain department in eastern France. It is sited on the eastern bank of the river Rhone, which forms the border with the Isere department to the west. 

The 18th century parish church is dedicated to St Didier.

Geography

Climate
Montagnieu has a oceanic climate (Köppen climate classification Cfb).

Population

See also
Communes of the Ain department

References

Communes of Ain
Ain communes articles needing translation from French Wikipedia